Graham Newcater (born September 3, 1941) is a South African composer of serial music (twelve tone music).

Career
Newcater was born September 3, 1941, in Johannesburg, Transvaal, Union of South Africa.

Newcater began composing at age twelve. Some of his student compositions were passed on to Erik Chisholm (the Dean of the Faculty of Music at the University of Cape Town) and the composer Arnold van Wyk. This resulted in Newcater being granted correspondence tuition for three years.

Newcater studied at the Royal College of Music in London under the composer Peter Racine Fricker, and later under Humphrey Searle, the British twelve-tone composer, and won the Vaughan Williams Award. Newcater was offered the post of senior lecturer in composition under Prof Faulkner, but problems with his work permit prevented Newcater staying in London and he returned to South Africa.

Partial list of works
First Symphony
Raka (ballet)
Variations de Timbre
Third Symphony
String Quartet
Songs of the Inner Worlds (soprano and orchestra)
Cape Chronicles
African Idylls (string quartet)

External links
Biography and list of works at DOMUS

1941 births
Living people
People from Johannesburg
South African composers
South African male composers